The 2010–11 Beşiktaş J.K. season was the club's 53rd season in the Süper Lig and their 107th year in existence. They will play in the 2010–11 Süper Lig and the 2010–11 UEFA Europa League, starting in the second qualifying round.

Current squad
This year Beşiktaş has one of its best squads in team history with the transfers of well known players, such as Ricardo Quaresma, Guti and Roberto Hilbert.

As of 22 July 2010.

Transfers

In

Out

Friendlies

Süper Lig

Beşiktaş participated in the 53rd season of the Süper Lig.

League table

Results by round

Team record

Matches

Turkish Cup

Beşiktaş participated in the 49th season of the Turkish Cup. In the playoff round, Beşiktaş defeated Mersin İdman Yurdu 3–0 in extra time to secure a berth in the group stage.

Playoff round

Group stage

Quarter-finals
 
 
Beşiktaş won 8–0 on aggregate

Semi-finals
 
 
Beşiktaş won 5–2 on aggregate

Final

UEFA Europa League

Beşiktaş qualified for the UEFA Europa League after finishing fourth in the Süper Lig in the 2009–10 season. They began the competition in the second qualifying round.

Second qualifying round

Beşiktaş won 7–0 on aggregate

Third qualifying round

Beşiktaş won 4–1 on aggregate.

Playoff round

Beşiktaş won 6–0 on aggregate.

Group stage

In the seeding, Beşiktaş were placed in Pot 2. Their opponents in the group stage of the competition were FC Porto of Portugal, CSKA Sofia of Bulgaria and Rapid Wien of Austria. Beşiktaş finished second with 13 points — after Porto with 16 points — to secure a berth in the Round of 32.

Round of 32
In the round of 32, Beşiktaş was matched with Dynamo Kyiv of Ukraine.

External links
 Beşiktaş J.K.

2010-11
Turkish football clubs 2010–11 season
2010–11 UEFA Europa League participants seasons